Gulzari is a village in Lakki Marwat District of Khyber Pakhtunkhwa. It is located at 32°36'48N 70°31'52E with an altitude of 360 metres (1184 feet).

References

Populated places in Lakki Marwat District